Christine Charles  is a physicist at the Australian National University in Canberra, Australia, an inventor, researcher and science communicator. Her position at the Australian National University is director of the Space Plasma, Power and Propulsion Laboratory.

Life 
Charles was born in Brittany, France, and studied engineering and applied physics at university in France. She completed a Ph. D in plasma physics and a bachelor of music in jazz from the Australian National University. Her specialist field is experimental expanding plasmas (hot ionized gases) and their use in electric propulsion, microelectronics and optoelectronics, astrophysical plasmas, and the development of fuel cells for the hydrogen economy. Charles invented the Helicon Double Layer Thruster, an electrode-less magneto-plasma space engine which could be used for keeping satellite stations in orbit, or interplanetary space travel for humans.

Charles broadcasts and discusses her research through a range of media including television (ABC Catalyst and Discovery Channel), radio and public lectures.

Recognition 
In 2009 Charles received the Australian Institute of Physics Women in Physics Lecturer of the Year Award. In 2011 she was a finalist in the Australian Innovation Challenge and the World Technology Awards. In 2013 she was elected to the American Physical Society. In 2015 she received the Women in Industry Excellence in Engineering Award and was elected to the Australian Academy of Science.

References

Living people
Year of birth missing (living people)
Academic staff of the Australian National University
Australian National University alumni
Science communicators
French emigrants to Australia
21st-century Australian inventors
Space scientists
Women space scientists
Fellows of the Australian Academy of Science
Fellows of the American Physical Society